Marius Ovidiu Mihalache  (born 14 December 1984) is a Romanian professional footballer who plays as a defender.

Honours

Politehnica Iași
Liga II: 2013–14
Divizia C: 2001–02

Auxerre Lugoj
Divizia C: 2005–06

Astra Ploiești
Liga III: 2007–08

References

External links
 
 

1984 births
Living people
Romanian footballers
Association football defenders
Liga I players
Liga II players
FC Astra Giurgiu players
FC Bihor Oradea players
FC Politehnica Iași (2010) players